Nemo is a French progressive rock band based in Le Puy-en-Velay, Haute-Loire.

The band was founded by guitarist, singer and songwriter Jean-Pierre Louveton, and was initially influenced by Genesis and Ange.

Discography

Albums 
 2002: Les nouveaux mondes
 2003: Présages
 2004: Prélude à la Ruine 2006: Si Partie I 2007: Si Partie II - L'Homme Idéal 2009: Barbares 2011: R€volu$ion 2013: Le ver dans le fruit (Double-CD)
 2015: Coma Live-Albums 
 2005: Immersion Publique 2009: Si live 2010: La Machine à Remonter les Temps (DVD + 2 CD)

 Singles 
 2004: Eve et le génie du mal 2007: Les enfants rois''

External links
Official Website
Review of R€volu$ion on Progsphere

French progressive rock groups
Musical groups established in 1999
Musical groups from Auvergne-Rhône-Alpes
1999 establishments in France